The California Flats Solar Project is a 280 megawatt (MWAC) photovoltaic power station on Hearst Communications' Jack Ranch in the Cholame Hills area of southeastern Monterey County, California, near the San Luis Obispo, Kings, and Fresno County borders in Central California.

The project was financed by California Flats Solar LLC, a subsidiary of First Solar, and will use the company's thin-film technology.  Construction began in 2016.  The project was sold to Swiss asset-management outfit Capital Dynamics in August 2017. The first 130 MW of production went online in November 2017 and the projected was completed in spring 2019.

The plant has two power purchase agreements: Apple Inc. has a 25-year deal for 130 MW to power its California operations, and Pacific Gas and Electric Company is purchasing 150 MW. Apple installs a 60 MW storage facility at the site.

Electricity production

See also

 Solar power in California

References

External links
First Solar.com: official California Flats Solar Project website

Photovoltaic power stations in the United States
Buildings and structures in Monterey County, California
Solar power stations in California